Lake Magdalene is a census-designated place (CDP) in Hillsborough County, Florida, United States. The population was 28,509 at the 2010 census.

Geography
Lake Magdalene is located in northwestern Hillsborough County at  (28.081294, -82.477945). It is bordered to the north by Lutz, to the east by the University neighborhood, to the south by the city of Tampa, to the southwest by Carrollwood, and to the west by Northdale. Interstate 275 forms the eastern edge of the CDP, and the Dale Mabry Highway (Florida State Road 597) forms the western edge.

There are at least 11 named lakes in the CDP, the largest of which is Lake Magdalene near the center of the community.

ZIP codes that serve Lake Magdalene are 33612, 33613 and 33618.

Demographics

As of the census of 2000, there were 28,755 people, 12,085 households, and 7,722 families residing in the community. The racial makeup of the community was 86.65% White, 5.91% African American, 0.35% Native American, 2.33% Asian, 0.03% Pacific Islander, 2.64% from other races, and 2.09% from two or more races. Hispanic or Latino of any race were 13.51% of the population. A decade later, 2010 Census figures show population growth in the Lake Magdalene CDP had essentially stagnated during the first decade of the 21st century, with 28,509 residents, or approximately 250 fewer individuals than counted in the 2000 Census report. Age and racial demographics in the community remained largely similar to the composition in 2000.

There were 12,085 households, out of which 28.9% had children under the age of 18 living with them, 49.5% were married couples living together, 10.9% had a female householder with no husband present, and 36.1% were non-families. 28.9% of all households were made up of individuals, and 8.6% had someone living alone who was 65 years of age or older.  The average household size was 2.35 and the average family size was 2.93.

In the community the population was spread out, with 22.5% under the age of 18, 7.9% from 18 to 24, 29.9% from 25 to 44, 26.8% from 45 to 64, and 13.0% who were 65 years of age or older.  The median age was 39 years. For every 100 females, there were 91.7 males.  For every 100 females age 18 and over, there were 89.7 males.

The median income for a household in the community was $43,259, and the median income for a family was $54,276. Males had a median income of $39,556 versus $30,398 for females. The per capita income for the community was $26,685.  About 5.6% of families and 7.2% of the population were below the poverty line, including 8.6% of those under age 18 and 8.1% of those age 65 or over.

Politically, Lake Magdalene is part of congressional district 14.

Schools
Lake Magdalene is served by Hillsborough County Public Schools through the following:
Lake Magdalene Elementary School
Miles Elementary School
Buchanan Middle School
Chamberlain High School
Gaither High School
Hillsborough County Public Schools has a magnet program and students in the district can attend these schools:
Walker Middle Magnet School
Hillsborough High School

History 
As a rural community northwest of Tampa, this area of Hillsborough County had welcomed enough residents to receive its first post office in 1888, followed by a scattering of schools and churches—most notably the United Brethren Church  
(now Lake Magdalene United Methodist), started in 1895 by Reverend Isaac W. Bearss, whose family line still maintains several acres of citrus groves in the region, butted up against the busy east-west, North Tampa corridor that bears the family name. The rustic qualities of Lake Magdalene remained until the 1990s when residential construction in Tampa pushed northward. By 1990 almost 16,000 people lived in Lake Magdalene, and according to the 2000 census, its population had nearly doubled to 28,755.

Lake Magdalene is surrounded by, and takes its name from, a  freshwater lake. The lake's name may come from the moniker of a Native American woman, Magdalena, who interpreted the language for a Spanish expedition into Florida in 1549, or the name may have resulted from the 1882 marriage in the community of John Parrish and Mary Magdalene Yates, daughter of Jonah Yates, first mayor of Plant City.

References

Census-designated places in Hillsborough County, Florida
Census-designated places in Florida